Daniel Johannes Coetzee is a South African politician who has been serving as a Member of the Northern Cape Provincial Legislature since 22 May 2019. He is the sole representative of the Freedom Front Plus (FF+) in the provincial legislature.

References

External links
Profile : Mr Daniel Johannes Coetzee – Northern Cape Provincial Legislature
Daniel Johannes Coetzee – People's Assembly

Living people
Afrikaner people
Members of the Northern Cape Provincial Legislature
Year of birth missing (living people)